Aiken Winter Colony Historic District II, located in Aiken, South Carolina. It is one of the three districts associated with the Aiken Winter Colony. This district, with over 100 properties, has approximately three times as many structures as Historic District I.  District II also offers a number of impressive residences and outbuildings, as well the famous inn, Wilcox's.”  The properties were constructed between 1880 and 1930.  This visually appealing district was placed in the National Register of Historic Places on November 27, 1984.

References

Historic districts in Aiken County, South Carolina
National Register of Historic Places in Aiken County, South Carolina
Historic districts on the National Register of Historic Places in South Carolina
Buildings and structures in Aiken, South Carolina